The summer transfer windows of 2006–07 season was in two phase:
For the co-ownership deals
List of Italian football transfers summer 2006 (co-ownership)
For the main transfer windows
List of Italian football transfers summer 2006 (July)
List of Italian football transfers summer 2006 (August)

2006
Italy